Since the 1980s, the introduction of hip hop and electro music brought street art to the UK on a large scale. This was further expanded with the introduction of custom may spray paint which allowed artists to create even more artistic and experimental graffiti. Notably, Banksy is arguably one of the most famous graffiti artists in the UK, but it was the crews such as DryBreadZ who first gained recognition. Examples of UK graffiti artists include: Banksy, Stik, Inkie and My Dog Sighs.

Graffiti was not considered a credible form of art until the 2000s with the likes of Alex Martinez spreading awareness of this new type of art form. As a result of this art collectors began to get street artists to do commissioned pieces of art for them which lead to graffiti becoming a viable option for street artists to earn some money.

Penalties  
When the criminal damage caused by the graffiti exceeds £5,000 the maximum penalty for individuals aged 18 or more is 10 years imprisonment and the maximum penalty for people ages between 12 and 17 is a detention and training order up to 24 months. Alternatively if the damage is less than £5,000 the maximum sentence possible is 3 months imprisonment or a total fine of £2,500 for adults. The Anti-social Behaviour Act 2003 allows police community support officers an alternative remedy by allowing them to issue penalty notices of £50.

An example of this UK punishment is the case of Tom Collister. Collister belonged to a gang of graffiti artists who were carrying out acts of vandalism across South London, mainly on trains and at stations. He was said to be linked to the tags SKEAMS, SKEAMZ, SKEAM and FDC. In October 2008 Collister was given a 30-month sentence for his crimes after pleading guilty to conspiracy to commit criminal damage. He was sentenced along with the other three members of his gang, Darren Austin, who was given 18 months; William Setzdemspey, who was given 15 months; and Joshua Phiel who was given 12 months. All four members were initially taken to HMP Wandsworth, however in January 2009 Collister was transferred to Camp Hill Prison, making it much harder for his family to support him, while his co-defendants remained in Wandsworth. In February 2009 Collister's sentencing appeal was heard in London and the sentence was reduced by 10 months therefore meaning he was now only to serve 20 months. He was said to be severely distressed when he was told he would be returning to Camp Hill Prison to complete the remainder of his sentence and was found dead just four days later. A statement from the inquest jury at the Coroner's Court in the Isle of Wight released their verdict claiming that there were several failures in the Prison's care system provided to Collister. The jury found many issues in the prison's supervision on the night of Collister's death. There was a lack of supervision resulting in lack of prisoner safety on the wing, the officer who found Collister did not have adequate training to deal with such an emergency situation, with no sense of how to react to suspected suicide or self-harm. They also lacked sufficient resuscitation and first-aid training. Collister's family believed that he had not intended to take his own life, it was a suspected cry for help that had gone severely wrong.

References

Public art in the United Kingdom
Graffiti and unauthorised signage